Pawat Chittsawangdee (also known as Ohm, born 22 March 2000) is a Thai actor. He is known for his main roles as Frame in MCOT HD's Make It Right (2016–2017), as an adult Thun in GMMTV's He's Coming to Me (2019), as the title character in the film Dew (2019). His latest hit is Bad Buddy (2021-2022) costarring Korapat Kirdpan. He also portrayed a main role as Khet in The Shipper (2020) and had a role in Vice Versa (2022) being Tess.

Early life and education 
Pawat was born in Bangkok, Thailand. He completed his secondary education at Assumption College. He received a bachelor's degree in cinema and digital media under the College of Social Communication Innovation of Srinakharinwirot University.

Career 
In 2016, Pawat started in the entertainment industry with his first role as Frame in MCOT HD's television series Make It Right and later reprised his role in its second season in 2017. Before becoming part of GMMTV, he was initially invited by its managing director, Sataporn Panichraksapong, to audition for an upcoming series. He then accepted the invitation and successfully landed the role of an adult Thun in He's Coming to Me, where he was paired with Prachaya Ruangroj (Singto), thereby making it as his first acting role with the said talent agency.

He starred in the Thai romantic movie Dew where he played the leading role of Dew. In 2021, Pawat was paired with Korapat Kirdpan (Nanon) in Bad Buddy. He and Korapat will have a fan meeting event in the Philippines in January 2023.

Filmography

Film

Television

Music video appearances

Online Show

Awards and nominations

References

External links 
 
 
 

2000 births
Living people
Pawat Chittsawangdee
Pawat Chittsawangdee
Pawat Chittsawangdee
Pawat Chittsawangdee
Pawat Chittsawangdee